King of the Jungle is a 2000 American drama film starring John Leguizamo, Rosie Perez, Michael Rapaport, Marisa Tomei, Rosario Dawson, Julie Carmen, Justin Pierce and Cliff Gorman. It was written and directed by Seth Zvi Rosenfeld.

Premise
Seymour's happy New York City existence comes to a tragic end after he witnesses the murder of his mother, a renowned civil rights activist. When he finds a gun in the home of his best friend, he embarks on a deranged quest for revenge.

Cast
 John Leguizamo as Seymour 
 Rosie Perez as Joanne
 Julie Carmen as Mona 
 Cliff Gorman as Jack 
 Michael Rapaport as Francis 
 Marisa Tomei as Detective Costello
 Justin Pierce as "Lil' Mafia" 
 Rosario Dawson as Veronica
 Annabella Sciorra as "Mermaid"
 Judy Reyes as Lydia Morreto
 Richie Perez as "Pucho"
 Ian "Blaze" Kelley as "Dead-Eye"
 Rafeal Nunez as Basketball Kid #1
 Malcolm Barrett as Basketball Kid 2
 Raymond Vincente as Colon
 Yan Ming as "Fat" Ming

Reception

The movie received a mixed reception from critics.

References

External links 
 
 

2000 films
2000 drama films
Films set in New York City
Films scored by Harry Gregson-Williams
American drama films
2000s English-language films
2000s American films